This page presents the results of the men's and women's volleyball tournament during the 1983 Pan American Games, which was held from August 17 to August 27, 1983 in Caracas, Venezuela.

Men's indoor tournament

Preliminary round robin

Final Round

Final ranking

Women's indoor tournament

Preliminary round robin

Final Round

Final ranking

References
 Men's results
 Women's results

Pan American Games
1983
Events at the 1983 Pan American Games